Mel Purcell (born July 18, 1959) is a former professional tennis player and coach from the U.S. His career-high singles ranking was world No. 21, achieved in November 1980. Purcell's finest moment was when he reached the quarterfinals of Wimbledon in 1983. He was head coach of the Murray State University men's tennis team from 1996 to 2016.

Early years
Purcell grew up in Murray, Kentucky, and played in the Kentucky State Tennis Tournament as a fifth-grader, and won two state doubles crowns with older brother Del as a middle schooler. He made the state singles finals three straight years, winning as a senior.

Purcell graduated Murray High School and went on to Memphis State University (now the University of Memphis), where he played for one year. He transferred to the University of Tennessee, where in 1980 he won an NCAA doubles championship with teammate Rodney Harmon.

Pro career
Purcell made his debut on the professional circuit in Summer 1980. As a wild card entrant at the Washington (D.C.) Star Tournament, he upset top-ranked Eddie Dibbs. Two weeks later, he qualified for a spot in the U.S. Clay Courts, where he beat Hank Pfister and top-10 ranked Harold Solomon, then lost in the finals to José Luis Clerc. Purcell saw his Association of Tennis Professionals (ATP) ranking soar from the 300s to the top 40 and was crowned 1980 ATP Rookie of the Year.

The next year, he played at Wimbledon, the first of six appearances (1981–85, 1987). He reached the quarterfinals in 1983, beating Tim Wilkison, Stuart Bale, Andreas Maurer and Brian Gottfried to reach the quarterfinals.

Purcell played in the US Open 10 times (1978–87) where he recorded victories over Stan Smith, Andrés Gómez and Ilie Năstase, among others. During this time, he was part of a rare match where he lost to  fifth-seeded José Luis Clerc in the third round of the 1981 US Open despite winning two sets 6–0. He competed in the French Open six times (1981–84, 1987–88) where he twice reached the fourth round in singles and in 1981 reached the doubles quarterfinals with Vincent Van Patten.

Another career highlight was beating Ivan Lendl at the U.S. Pro Tennis Championships in Boston in 1982.

Injuries to his elbow from a car accident and a pulled stomach muscle slowed his career in 1985, but a year later, he beat Boris Becker in the German Open.

Purcell won three ATP singles titles in 1981: at Atlanta, Tampa and Tel Aviv. He also teamed to claim four doubles titles: at Delray Beach (1982 with Chip Hooper), Munich (1982 with Eliot Teltscher) and Vienna (1983 with Stan Smith and 1987 with Tim Wilkison).

Awards and accolades 
In 2015, Purcell was inducted into The Kentucky Athletic Hall of Fame.

Career finals

Singles (3 titles)

Doubles (4 titles)

Today
Purcell was the head men's tennis coach at Murray State University from 1996 – when he succeeded his father, hall of fame coach Bennie Purcell – until the university dropped the sport in 2016. He led Murray State to back-to-back Ohio Valley Conference titles in 2001 and 2002 and was named OVC Coach of the Year both seasons.

He was still playing matches on the Jimmy Connors Champions Tour in his 40s, where he played against and sometimes beat Jimmy Connors, Björn Borg, and John McEnroe.

Purcell hosts a tennis camp every summer for children and teens.

References

External links
 
 
 Murray State University profile
 Murray State University Men's Tennis Team
 The Paducah Sun archives, 1990 four-part series about Mel Purcell

1959 births
Living people
Sportspeople from Joplin, Missouri
American male tennis players
Memphis Tigers men's tennis players
Murray High School (Kentucky) alumni
People from Murray, Kentucky
Tennis people from Kentucky
Tennis people from Missouri
Tennis players at the 1979 Pan American Games
Murray State Racers men's tennis coaches
Pan American Games medalists in tennis
Pan American Games gold medalists for the United States
Tennessee Volunteers men's tennis players
American tennis coaches